Kenneth Ernest Palmer (born 22 April 1937) is an English former cricketer and umpire, who played in one Test match in 1965, and umpired 22 Tests and 23 One Day Internationals from 1977 to 2001. He was born in Winchester, Hampshire.

Playing career
A reliable all-rounder for Somerset between 1955 and 1969, Palmer was a right-handed middle-order batsman and fast-medium bowler with a whippy action, whose best season was 1961, when he achieved the double of 1,000 runs and 100 wickets.

Palmer played one Test. Because of injuries to other bowlers (John Price, David Brown and Tom Cartwright), he was called up while coaching in Johannesburg to play in the fifth Test at Port Elizabeth, on the 1964-65 England tour of South Africa.

Umpiring
Palmer was appointed as an umpire in 1972, and made his international debut in the England versus Pakistan Test in June 1978.

Family connections
His brother, Roy Palmer, also played for Somerset, and equally became a first-class and Test match umpire. Ken's son Gary also played as an all-rounder for Somerset.

See also
 List of Test cricket umpires
 List of One Day International cricket umpires

References

External links
 

1937 births
Living people
England Test cricketers
English cricketers
Somerset cricketers
Commonwealth XI cricketers
International Cavaliers cricketers
English Test cricket umpires
English One Day International cricket umpires
Marylebone Cricket Club cricketers
Young England cricketers